The Romanian Youth Orchestra is the national youth orchestra of Romania.

Conductors and soloists that appeared with the orchestra include Bogdan Bacanu, Sarah Chang, Amanda Forsyth, David Garrett, Stefan Geiger, Andrei Ioniță, Kristjan Järvi, Roman Kim, Elizabeth Leonskaja, Plamena Mangova, Valentina Naforniță, Olga Pasichnyk, Olga Scheps, Emmanuel Séjourné and Pinchas Zukerman.

It is a member of the European Federation of National Youth Orchestras.

See also 
 List of youth orchestras

References 

Music education organizations
National youth orchestras
Romanian orchestras
European youth orchestras
Musical groups established in 2008